Korto is both a given name and a surname. Notable people with the name include:

Joseph Korto (1949–2020), Liberian politician
Korto Reeves Williams, Liberian feminist activist

See also
Korte (surname)